Calanthe striata is a species of orchid. It is native to Korea, Japan (including the Ryukyu Islands) and China (Hainan and Taiwan).

References

Orchids of China
Orchids of Japan
Orchids of Korea
Plants described in 1826
striata